Paul Ingemar Burgström (5 March 1926 – 9 July 1951) was a Swedish flyweight boxer. He competed at the 1948 Summer Olympics, but was eliminated in the first round.

1948 Olympic results
Below is the record of Ingemar Burgström, a Swedish flyweight boxer who competed at the 1948 London Olympics:

 Round of 32: lost to Des Williams (South Africa) on points

References

1926 births
1951 deaths
Boxers at the 1948 Summer Olympics
Olympic boxers of Sweden
Swedish male boxers
Flyweight boxers
20th-century Swedish people